Jure Golčer (born July 12, 1977 in Maribor) is a Slovenian former professional road bicycle racer, who competed professionally between 2001 and 2018 for the Corratec World MTB Team,  (three spells),  and

Major results 

2001
 3rd Overall Jadranska Magistrala
2002
 1st Overall Jadranska Magistrala
 5th Overall Tour of Slovenia
2003
 2nd Overall Tour of Slovenia
1st Stage 5
 2nd Overall Tour of Austria
 4th Time trial, National Road Championships
 5th GP Triberg-Schwarzwald
 6th Poreč Trophy 3
 8th Overall Jadranska Magistrala
2004
 1st Giro d'Oro
 2nd Overall Giro del Trentino
 5th Overall Tour of Austria
2005
 6th Overall Brixia Tour
2006
 1st  Road race, National Road Championships
 1st Overall Tour of Slovenia
 1st GP Hydraulika Mikolasek
 1st GP Triberg-Schwarzwald
 7th Overall The Paths of King Nikola
 7th Giro del Belvedere
2007
 3rd Overall Tour of Austria
 4th Memorial Marco Pantani
 7th Monte Paschi Eroica
 8th Overall Tour of Slovenia
2008
 1st Overall Tour of Slovenia
1st Stage 3
 4th Overall Giro del Trentino
 9th Overall Tour of Austria
 10th Overall Settimana Ciclistica Lombarda
2010
 5th Road race, National Road Championships
2011
 10th Overall Szlakiem Grodów Piastowskich
2012
 3rd Overall Flèche du Sud
 7th Overall Szlakiem Grodów Piastowskich
 7th Overall Tour of Slovenia
2013
 3rd Road race, National Road Championships
 7th Overall Tour of Slovenia
 7th Raiffeisen Grand Prix
2014
 4th Overall Rhône-Alpes Isère Tour
 5th Road race, National Road Championships
 8th Overall Tour of Austria
 9th Overall Tour of Slovenia
2015
 3rd Overall Tour of Slovenia
 7th Overall Rhône-Alpes Isère Tour
2016
 1st GP Izola
 5th Overall Istrian Spring Trophy
 5th Overall Tour of Slovenia
2018
 6th GP Laguna
 8th Overall Szlakiem Walk Majora Hubala

References

External links 

Slovenian male cyclists
1977 births
Living people
Cyclists at the 2008 Summer Olympics
Olympic cyclists of Slovenia
Sportspeople from Maribor